Jannik Kåre Jonatan Spang Olesen (born 4 February 1978) is a Danish standup comedian, actor and former theater director at Nørrebro Teater. Spang debuted as a standup comedian in 1998. The following year he was admitted to the School of Acting at Aarhus Theatre and won the championship in Stand-Up a talent competition for amateur comedians.

Theater and stand-up shows 
 Damer (standup, 2005)
 Gynt (Betty Nansen Teater, 2005)
 Gustne Gensyn (standup, 2006)
 Købmanden (Betty Nansen Theatre, 2007)
 Biblen (standup, 2008)
 Jonatan Spangs Familie (standup, 2008)
 Familie (Stand up, 2008)
 Spark i Løgsuppen (standup, 2009)
 Kjeld og Dirch: En Kærlighedshistorie (Nørrebro Theatre, 2011)
 Bryllup (standup, 2013)
 Jonatan Spangs Danmark (Stand up, 2015)

Filmography 
 Fidibus (2006)
 De unge år (2007)
 Alle for en (2011)
 Over kanten (2012)
 Rivalen (2012)
 Forbrydelsen III (2012)
 Talenttyven (2012)
 Alle for to (2013)
 Tæt på sandheden (2017)

External links 
 Jonatan Spangs website
 

1978 births
Danish male film actors
Danish stand-up comedians
People from Gladsaxe Municipality
Living people